The 2020 League of Ireland Cup, also known for sponsorship reasons as the 2020 EA Sports Cup, was the 47th season of the League of Ireland's secondary knockout competition. The EA Sports Cup features teams from the SSE Airtricity League Premier and First Divisions, as well as some intermediate level teams. The competition was deferred indefinitely on March 20 by the Football Association of Ireland as a result of the Coronavirus pandemic.

First round

All ten teams from the League of Ireland First Division, with the exception of Shamrock Rovers II, enter the competition at this stage. One representative from the Leinster Senior League. the Munster Senior League and the Ulster Senior League enter at this point also. The draw for the first round was made on 18 February with fixtures originally set for 9 and 10 March.

Second round
All Premier Division teams were due to enter at the second round stage of the competition.

Top scorers

References

Cup
3
League of Ireland Cup seasons
League of Ireland Cup